In organic chemistry, an ynone  is an organic compound containing a ketone functional group and a  triple bond.  Many ynones are α,β-ynones, where the carbonyl and alkyne groups are conjugated. Capillin is a naturally occurring example.  Some ynones are not conjugated.

Synthesis of α,β-ynones
One method for synthesizing ynones is the acyl substitution reaction of an alkynyldimethylaluminum with an acyl chloride. An alkynyldimethylaluminum compound is the reaction product of trimethylaluminum and a terminal alkyne.

An alternative is the direct coupling of an acyl chloride with a terminal alkyne, using a copper-based nanocatalyst:

Other methods utilize an oxidative cleavage of an aldehyde, followed by reaction with a hypervalent alkynyl iodide, using a gold catalyst.

An alternative but longer synthetic method involves the reaction of an alkynyllithium compound with an aldehyde. The reaction produces a secondary alcohol that then can be oxidized via the Swern oxidation.

Synthesis of β,γ- and γ,δ-ynones
Terminal alkynes add across α,β-unsaturated ketones in the presence of palladium catalysts.  The reaction affords γ,δ-ynones.  Terminal alkynes add across epoxides to given yneols, which can be oxidized to give β,γ-ynones.

Further reading
Bis-ynones can undergo an intramolecular cycloaddition to form furan derivatives.

See also
Diketone

References

External links

Functional groups
Ketones
Alkyne derivatives